Shake, Rattle and Roll 12 is a 2010 Filipino horror anthology film produced by Regal Entertainment and the twelfth installment of the Shake, Rattle & Roll film series. It is directed by Zoren Legaspi, Topel Lee and Jerrold Tarog. The film stars an ensemble cast including Shaina Magdayao, Carla Abellana, Andi Eigenmann, John Lapus, Rayver Cruz, Sid Lucero, Ricky Davao, Jackie Lou Blanco, Rita Avila, Malou Crisologo, Regine Angeles, Martin Escudero, Nash Aguas, Elijah Alejo, Anna Vicente, Kristel Moreno, Niña Jose, John Feir, and Gaby Dela Merced.

The film was distributed by Regal Entertainment and Regal Multimedia. It was an official entry in the 2010 Metro Manila Film Festival.

It is also the last film appearance of actor John Apacible, who died in a shooting incident in Quezon City, Diliman on March 20, 2011, at the age of 38.

The thirteenth installment, Shake, Rattle & Roll 13, was released in 2011.

Plot

"Mamanyiika"
Some years ago, Abel (Ricky Davao) was incapacitated by a passing car while his wife Gail (Jackie Lou Blanco) was killed in a hit-and-run accident, after a serious fight, leaving Abel widowed with his two children, Ara (Shaina Magdayao) and Abigail (Elijah Alejo).

After visiting her mother's grave, Abigail picked up a seemingly-disposed-of doll in a nearby barrow. Ara, being suspicious of the doll, demanded her sister throw it away. This soon culminated in a sisterly fight, on which one instance, the doll sprang to life and comforted Abigail. It was thought that Gail's spirit possessed the doll.

Traumatized after being assaulted by the doll, Ara destroyed her little sister's toy, despite of Abigail watching the scene horribly. Abel, deciding this was the final straw for Ara, ordered the doll to be disposed of in the creek. Soon, the doll assassinated two garbage men and returned to the Federicos house, seeking vengeance against Abigail, who was given a new set of dolls by her father.

A subplot shows that the doll used to belong to Dorothy Cruz, an infertile woman who succumbed to insanity after learning her medical condition. Her husband Manuel (Jed Madela) refuses to give any comments to the doll. It was not Gail's spirit who was in the doll, but Dorothy's after all.

One night, the "mother doll" launched its final attack against the family, with Ara gaining the upper hand. Taunted by the doll imitating her mother's voice, Ara shot the doll squarely after it attempted to murder Abigail. The doll fell into the pool, but recovered and was taken by a homeless child.

"Isla"
A lost girl (Nina Jose) was separated from her friends while on a vacation. Lost in the woods, she was incapacitated by an unknown entity, which transforms her into an unimaginable creature.

In the present, Andrea (Andi Eigenmann) was accompanied by her friends Ces (Kristel Moreno) and Belle (Regine Angeles) on a vacation in a seemingly-remote island. Upon setting foot on the island, rumors circulated the trio that a man named Ray (Rayver Cruz) had lost his girlfriend during a holiday in the very same place. Dismissing the hearsay, the trio spent the night with a bonfire. Ces, who has a knowledge of the occult, performs a ritual to help the brokenhearted Andrea find the man for her.

Tensions rose as disappearances of Andrea startled the group, with their friend reappearing in the morning with muddy feet. Scenes showed that Andrea was led by fairies into a cave and was offered delicious food by an elemental or "engkanto" as well as asking her to stay and offering her to give her everything she wants if she decides to do so. Counseled by a "witch doctor", Malay (John Lapus), Andrea was the next target of the "engkanto" of the island, whom Malay said was the king of the isle. Afterwards, they met Ray himself. The girls seemed to be cold with the guy, as he was cold to them either.

No sooner than the disappearances worsen, a group of fairies dubbed as the "Lambana" attacked the group's cottage, assassinating Belle and Ces in the havoc. The engkanto, having a chance to permanently abduct Andrea, held the girl hostage, with Ray and Malay in hot pursuit. In the end, Malay was killed, but Ray managed to overpower the engkanto, saving Andrea's life.

In a post-plot scene, Andrea woke aboard a boat with Ray; however, she notices that the boat was not moving away from the island. It was revealed that it was just an illusion and that Andrea was still in the engkanto's cave with the engkanto as "Ray".

"Punerarya"
Dianne (Carla Abellana) works as a part-time tutor for the Gonzales', the owners of a local funeral parlor, which is said to be the lair of rumored werewolves.

On her first day, she met the patriarch Carlo (Sid Lucero), the children - Ryan (Nash Aguas) and Sarah (Anna Vicente) -, the family's butlers Aludia (Odette Khan) and Simeon (Jess Evardone), and the secretary Anna (Gaby dela Merced). After a series of successful tutorial sessions, it gradually became clear to Dianne the nature of the family: being photophobic, having a desire for human entrails, and, worst of all, the unusual activity in and out of the parlor.

Dennis (Mart Escudero), Dianne's brother, dismissed his sister's stories; meanwhile, Ryan was accused of divulging the truth to Dianne, creating a tension between Carlo and the tutor. However, Dianne could not brought herself to quit, not only because of being friends with Ryan, but also this was her only work for a living.

As a plot, the family lured Dennis, who was waiting for her sister outside. Unknown to him, he was used as a bait to force Diane to continue her work, but at the same time, sacrificing her life as prey to the human-dog creatures. Carlo then revealed that they were once part of an ancient tribe, whose homes were ravaged by fire. Desperate, he Carlo, being widowed, and his family set up the funeral parlor to cover up their true nature and to earn for a living. This explained their photophobic features and the fact of dismissing Dianne every evening before sundown.

Dianne confronted the group, demanding they surrender Dennis. Throwing formaldehyde and setting the parlor aflame as a diversion, Dianne and her brother narrowly escaped Sarah's and Carlo's assaults, while Ryan, the only aswang member of the family that refuses to harm anyone, begged to go with her. Left with no choice, Dianne brought Ryan home, as the funeral parlor burned to the ground.

As Dianne finds the first-aid kit to treat Dennis, she overhears his screams. She rushes to the den and finds Ryan eating Dennis' entrails. Ryan reveals that his family only eats living humans on their birthdays and just eats entrails from corpses to survive every day. However, Ryan wanted more and prefers to eat living humans every day. Dianne realizes that she was used by Ryan so that he can get rid of his family and their restrictions as he growls and pounces on her.

Cast

Mamanyika 
 Shaina Magdayao as Ara
 Ricky Davao as Abel
 Malou Crisologo as Yaya Miley
 Rita Avila as Dorothy Cruz
 Jackie Lou Blanco as Gail
 Elijah Alejo as Abigail 
 John Feir as Fermin
 Carmina Villarroel as Head Nurse
 Jed Madela as Garbage Man 1
 John Apacible† as Garbage Man 2
 Mahal† as Haunted Doll / Mamanyika

Isla 
 Andi Eigenmann as Andrea
 Rayver Cruz as Ray
 John Lapus as Malay
 Niña Jose as Ray's Girlfriend
 Regine Angeles as Belle
 Kristel Moreno as Ces
 Solo Kiggins as Jok
 Richard Quan as Domeng
 CJ Navato as Young Ray

Punerarya 
 Carla Abellana as Dianne
 Sid Lucero as Carlo
 Nash Aguas as Ryan
 Martin Escudero as Dennis
 Gaby Dela Merced as Anna
 Odette Khan as Aludia
 Jess Evardone as Simeon
 Anna Vicente as Sarah
 Dido dela Paz as Rolly
 Mercedes Cabral as Pregnant Woman
 Althea Vega

Reception

Box office
By the end of the festival, the film grossed .

Critical response
Althea Lauren Ricardo of The Freeman gave the film a rating of 7 out of 10 (70%) stating that while it continued the traditional 3-in-1 format, it was "infused with a dash of indie spirit". The second episode - Isla - was described as the "weirdest segment in the trio" due to how its scenes were put together.

See also
 Shake, Rattle & Roll (film series)
List of ghost films

Accolades

References

External links
 

2010 films
Philippine horror films
Philippine independent films
Films directed by Jerrold Tarog
Regal Entertainment films